Ljubiša Ranković (born 10 December 1973) is a Serbian former footballer who played as a midfielder.

Playing career
After playing for Rad in the First League of FR Yugoslavia over one and a half seasons, Ranković was transferred abroad to South Korean club Ilhwa Chunma in October 1995, helping the team win the K League in November and the Asian Club Championship in December of that year. He later made 12 appearances in the 1996 K League and five appearances in the 1996 Korean League Cup.

Following his stint in Asia, Ranković joined Partizan in early 1997. He spent seven seasons with the Crno-beli, including loan spells to Chinese club Sichuan Dahe in 2002, as well as to fellow Serbian club Zemun in 2003. Subsequently, Ranković moved abroad to France and joined Ligue 2 side Caen. He helped them earn promotion to Ligue 1 in his first season at the club. However, as they immediately suffered relegation from the top flight, Ranković left the country and signed for Ukrainian club Metalurh Zaporizhzhia in the summer of 2005. He returned to French football six months later and joined Ligue 2 club Sète, before hanging up his boots in 2006.

Post-playing career
After retiring from the game, Ranković was a member of technical staff at his former club Partizan for seven years until December 2014, before joining Belarusian side Dinamo Minsk as assistant manager to Dušan Uhrin Jr. ahead of the 2015 season. He was brought to the club by newly appointed director of football Vuk Rašović. After Rašović replaced Uhrin as manager, Ranković remained serving as an assistant. He returned to Partizan in August 2016, becoming assistant manager to Marko Nikolić. In June 2017, Ranković joined Aleksandar Stanojević in Greece as his assistant at PAOK. He rejoined Partizan in October 2017 to assist Miroslav Đukić. In April 2018, Ranković became assistant manager to Mladen Krstajić with the Serbia national team, less than two months ahead of the 2018 World Cup. He also continued to assist Đukić at Partizan until the end of the season. In June 2018, it was announced that Ranković would be joining Vuk Rašović as an assistant at Emirati club Al Dhafra.

Honours
Ilhwa Chunma
 K League: 1995
 Asian Club Championship: 1995
Partizan
 First League of FR Yugoslavia: 1996–97, 1998–99
 FR Yugoslavia Cup: 1997–98, 2000–01

References

External links
 
 
 

Association football midfielders
Chinese Super League players
Expatriate football managers in Belarus
Expatriate football managers in Greece
Expatriate football managers in the United Arab Emirates
Expatriate footballers in China
Expatriate footballers in France
Expatriate footballers in South Korea
Expatriate footballers in Ukraine
FC Metalurh Zaporizhzhia players
FC Sète 34 players
First League of Serbia and Montenegro players
FK Partizan non-playing staff
FK Partizan players
FK Rad players
FK Zemun players
K League 1 players
Ligue 1 players
Ligue 2 players
PAOK FC non-playing staff
Seongnam FC players
Serbia and Montenegro expatriate footballers
Serbia and Montenegro expatriate sportspeople in China
Serbia and Montenegro expatriate sportspeople in France
Serbia and Montenegro expatriate sportspeople in South Korea
Serbia and Montenegro expatriate sportspeople in Ukraine
Serbia and Montenegro footballers
Serbian expatriate football managers
Serbian expatriate sportspeople in Belarus
Serbian expatriate sportspeople in Greece
Serbian expatriate sportspeople in the United Arab Emirates
Serbian football managers
Serbian footballers
Sportspeople from Valjevo
Stade Malherbe Caen players
Ukrainian Premier League players
1973 births
Living people